The Stars Fell on Henrietta is a 1995 American drama film from Warner Bros., directed by James Keach and produced by Clint Eastwood. The film is based on a short story written by Winifred Sanford titled "Luck". The script for the film was penned by Philip Railsback, who is Sanford's grandson.

Plot
The setting is early America during the oil boom. An elderly, down on his luck 'oil man', Mr. Cox (Robert Duvall) finds himself in the town of Henrietta. Using unconventional methods, he convinces himself and local Don Day (Aidan Quinn) that there is oil on Day's land. The financially strapped Day puts everything into finding oil...but at what cost?

Cast
Robert Duvall as Mr. Cox
Aidan Quinn as Don Day
Frances Fisher as Cora Day
Brian Dennehy as Big Dave McDermot
Billy Bob Thornton as Roy
Lexi Randall as Beatric Day
Kaytlyn Knowles as Pauline Day
Francesca Eastwood as Mary Day (as Francesca Ruth Eastwood)
Joe Stevens as Big Dave's Driver
Victor Wong as Henry Nakai
Paul Lazar as Seymour
Spencer Garrett as Delbert Tims
Park Overall as Shirl
Zach Grenier as Larry Ligstow
Wayne Dehart as Robert
Woody Watson as Jack Sterling
Rodger Boyce as P.G. Pratt
George Haynes as Stratmeyer
Robert Westenberg as Mr. Rumsfelk
Landon Peterson as Raymond Rumsfelk
Richard Lineback as Les Furrows
Dylan Baker as Alex Wilde
Cliff Stephens as Arnold Humphries
Rob Campbell as Kid
Tom Aldredge as Grizzled Old Man
Jerry Haynes as Farmer #2
Robert A. Burns as Farmer #3
Blue Deckert as Farmer #4

Production
Filming took place in Abilene, Texas and Bartlett, Texas on a budget of $13,000,000.

Reception
The film received mostly mixed reviews, holding only a 50% on Rotten Tomatoes, though Robert Duvall's performance was widely praised. Roger Ebert of the Chicago Sun-Times wrote, "The movie may be worth seeing for (Robert Duvall's) performance, but the story itself is disappointing; it seems to travel around the same track once too often, and when the payoff comes, it seems short-circuited." Kenneth Turan of the Los Angeles Times wrote, "Duvall's performance, however, is frankly on a different level than anything else in the film...With his innate ability to create people whole, to make his familiar mannerisms and gestures work effectively in every situation, Duvall is an actor to wonder at. Although it is not within his power to save the picture."

References

External links

1995 films
1995 drama films
Films set in Texas
Films shot in Texas
Malpaso Productions films
American drama films
Films directed by James Keach
Films set in 1935
Films produced by Clint Eastwood
Films produced by David Valdes
Films based on short fiction
1990s English-language films
1990s American films